Tricot is a commune in the Oise department in northern France. Tricot station has rail connections to Amiens and Compiègne.

See also
Communes of the Oise department

References

Communes of Oise